Lavushimanda District is a district of Muchinga Province, Zambia. It was named after the Lavushi Manda National Park and separated from Mpika District in 2017. It also contains a town centre of the same name (Lavushimanda) on the Great North Road.

References 

Districts of Muchinga Province